The Quality Assurance Agency of Higher Education (ASCAL) is an independent public agency responsible for promoting and ensuring the quality of higher education in Albania. ASCAL conducts a thorough, objective and independent evaluation of all higher education institutions and the study programs they have to offer.

See also
 Education in Albania
 List of universities in Albania

References

 
Higher education authorities
Regulation in Albania